Nicolas Flégeau (born 6 September 1985) is a French professional footballer who plays as a defender for Villefranche in the Championnat National.

Career 
Flégeau started his career with Lorient, where he made five appearances in Ligue 2 during the 2004–05 season. He then had spells in the French lower divisions with Les Herbiers and Aviron Bayonnais, before returning to Ligue 2 with newly promoted Istres on 4 June 2012. Flégeau spent three seasons with Istres, playing 55 league matches. On 13 June 2012, he signed for Gazélec Ajaccio on a free transfer. However, with only four Ligue 2 appearances, he left for Vannes OC when Gazélec Ajaccio changed their manager.

In 2014 Flégeau returned to Istres for the start of the season, before signing a two-and-a-half-year contract with SO Cholet in February 2015.

Flégeau left Cholet in the summer of 2018, and signed for Championnat National 2 side Bergerac Périgord FC. After a year he moved to FC Villefranche in the Championnat National.

References

External links
 Nicolas Flégeau profile at foot-national.com
 
 

1985 births
Living people
People from Hennebont
Sportspeople from Morbihan
Association football defenders
French footballers
Ligue 2 players
Championnat National players
Championnat National 2 players
Championnat National 3 players
FC Lorient players
FC Istres players
Les Herbiers VF players
Aviron Bayonnais FC players
Gazélec Ajaccio players
Vannes OC players
SO Cholet players
Bergerac Périgord FC players
FC Villefranche Beaujolais players
Footballers from Brittany